The 2022–23 California Golden Bears women's basketball team represented the University of California, Berkeley during the 2022–23 NCAA Division I women's basketball season.  The Golden Bears, led by fourth year head coach Charmin Smith, played their home games at Haas Pavilion and competed as members of the Pac-12 Conference.

Previous season 
The Golden Bears finished the season 11–13, 2–12 in Pac-12 play to finish in eleventh place. They lost in the first round of the Pac-12 women's tournament to Utah.

Roster

Schedule

|-
!colspan=12 style=| Exhibition

|-
!colspan=12 style=| Non-conference regular season

|-
!colspan=12 style=| Pac-12 regular season

|-
!colspan=12 style=| Pac-12 Women's Tournament

Source:

Rankings

*The preseason and week 1 polls were the same.^Coaches did not release a week 2 poll.

See also
2022–23 California Golden Bears men's basketball team

Notes

References

California Golden Bears women's basketball seasons
California
California Golden Bears
California Golden Bears